Gwydir  may refer to:

Australia
Division of Gwydir, electoral division
Gwydir by-election, 1989
Gwydir Highway, New South Wales
Gwydir River, New South Wales
Gwydir Shire, New South Wales
Gwydir Wetlands, New South Wales

United Kingdom
Gwydir Castle, Conwy, Wales
Gwydir Forest, Conwy, Wales
Gwydyr House, Whitehall, London
Gwydyr Mansions, Hove, East Sussex
 Gwydir Street, a residential terraced street constructed in 1863 in Cambridge
 Gwydir Cottage, a Grade II listed property in Sidmouth, Devon

See also
Baron Gwydyr, an extinct title in the Peerage of Great Britain